The North Baikal Highlands are a mountainous area in Eastern Siberia, Russia. Administratively the territory of the uplands is part of Buryatia and Irkutsk Oblast.

The nearest airport is Mama Airport.

History
Between 1855 and 1858 Ivan Kryzhin (d. 1884) took part in the Eastern Siberian expedition led by Russian astronomer and traveler Ludwig Schwarz. In 1857 he mapped the Kirenga River and, while exploring its right tributary, the Cherepanikha, Kryzhin discovered the formerly unknown Akitkan Range rising above the area of its source.  

Between 1909 and 1911 the North Baikal Highlands were explored by Russian geologist Pavel Preobrazhensky (1874 - 1944). He surveyed the river valleys of the area, all of them tributaries of the Lena basin, including the Chechuy, Chaya, the Chuya, Kirenga and its right tributaries, as well as the Mama. 

Preobrazhensky's trip very nearly ended in tragedy when his boat crashed and capsized while navigating down the Chaya River. Badly injured and shaken, Pavel and his team almost lost their lives and their valuable equipment sank. Despite the difficulties, Preobrazhensky managed to map the area cutting across several places and outlining the entire North Baikal Highlands. His data revealed that it was a complex system of distinct high massifs, gathered either in small irregular groups or in short ridges, that were separated from each other by deep and narrow valleys. In the western part of the North Baikal mountainous land he mapped for the first time a  stretch of the Akitkan Range.

Geography 
The North Baikal Highlands are separated from the Patom Highlands to the northeast by river Vitim, a tributary of the Lena. The highlands stretch southwards to the Upper Angara Range and southeastwards to the Delyun-Uran Range. To the northwest begins the Central Siberian Plateau and to the east the Delyun-Uran Range of the Stanovoy Highlands.

There are clear traces of ancient glaciation in the uppermost parts of the ranges.

The main subranges are:
Synnyr Massif (Сынныр), highest point  
Akitkan Range (хребет Акиткан), highest point 
Ungdar Range (хребет Унгдар), highest point 
Upper Angara Range (Верхнеангарский хребет), highest point

Hydrography
The rivers of the North Baikal Highlands belong to the Baikal and Lena basins. Their valleys are deep. The highland area is marked by permafrost.

Flora 

There are taiga forests of conifers, mostly larch, in the slopes of the mountains. At higher altitudes there is mountain tundra. Further up the mountaintops are either flat or topped by golets-type bare rocky summits.

See also
List of mountains and hills of Russia

References

External links

Petrogenesis and age of felsic volcanics of the North-Baikal volcanic-plutonic belt
Prominent Geologists - VSEGEI Portrait Gallery
Северо-Байкальское нагорье - Tourism
History of Exploration (in Russian)
Mountains of Russia
Landforms of Irkutsk Oblast
Landforms of Buryatia
South Siberian Mountains
ru:Северо-Байкальское нагорье